Oleksandr Mishurenko (born 25 October 1988) is a professional Ukrainian football midfielder who plays for Skoruk Tomakivka.

He is product of several youth clubs from Nikopol, Ukraine. Mishurenko made his debut at senior level for FC Shturm Dnipropetrovsk at the Dnipro city competitions in 2007. His first professional club FC Inhulets Petrove which he joined at amateur level in 2015 Mishurenko made in 2016.

Still playing for Inhulets, Mishurenko was recognized by the PFL as a player of the month for June 2020. He became a second player of Inhulets to receive this honor.

References

External links
 
 
 

1988 births
Living people
People from Nikopol, Ukraine
Ukrainian footballers
Association football forwards
FC VPK-Ahro Shevchenkivka players
FC Inhulets Petrove players
FC Inhulets-2 Petrove players
FC Kryvbas Kryvyi Rih players
FC Skoruk Tomakivka players
Ukrainian Premier League players
Ukrainian First League players
Ukrainian Second League players
Sportspeople from Dnipropetrovsk Oblast